Stanlow Refinery is an oil refinery owned by Essar Energy in Ellesmere Port, North West England. Until 2011 it was owned by Shell UK. The refinery is situated on the south bank of the Manchester Ship Canal, which is used to transport seaborne oil for refining and chemicals for Essar and Shell.

Stanlow has a refining capacity of 12 million tonnes per year with a barrel per day capacity of 296,000. Consequently, it is the second largest in the United Kingdom after Fawley Refinery, and produces a sixth of the UK's petrol needs. Stanlow is also a large producer for commodities such as jet fuel and diesel.

Although situated in North West England, the refinery serves much of England as it is linked to the UK oil pipeline network. Oil is delivered to the Tranmere Oil Terminal via ship, then pumped to Stanlow for refining and stored for delivery.

History

The refinery occupies nearly  near the River Mersey and dates back to 1924, when a small bitumen plant was established. Stanlow & Thornton railway station was opened in 1940 to give workers access to the site and the facility an extra mode of transport. However, this station is now only served by three trains daily towards each of Ellesmere Port (westbound) and Helsby (eastbound), with these services scheduled to depart at times which would be inconvenient for the workers.

In the 1974 an oil pipeline was commissioned from Amlwch, Anglesey to Stanlow. Crude oil was pumped ashore from tankers moored at deep-water pontoons to a holding station at Rhosgoch, from there it was pumped through two 36-inch diameter pipelines, 127 km to Stanlow. The pipeline had closed by 1990.

Crude oil is now received lower down river on the Mersey at the Tranmere Oil Terminal, operated by the Mersey Docks and Harbour Company from its Liverpool headquarters, and is transferred via a fifteen-mile (24 km) pipeline to storage at Stanlow. Output is delivered via various means, including by pipeline via the UK oil pipeline network, road and the Manchester Ship Canal. There is also a pipeline for jet fuel to Manchester Airport.

In 1969 Shell-Mex & BP opened a £3 million joint venture bulk liquid distribution centre at Haydock, Lancashire. This was built on a 90-acre site and was designed to store up to 1 million tonnes of oil. It handled 5,000 tonnes of oil products daily, comprising 22 million gallons (100,000 m3) of white oil and 42 million gallons (191,000 m3) of black oil a year. The terminal was supplied with light oils via a 41.6 km pipeline from Stanlow refinery; heavy oils were delivered by two trains per day from Stanlow, and three daily trains from Heysham refinery. Oil products were loaded into a fleet of 100 road tankers for distribution.

In 2010, Royal Dutch Shell declared their desire to sell off some refineries in Europe to concentrate on emerging markets in Asia and the Middle East, which led to the possibility that Stanlow would be shut down indefinitely. However, Shell said that a number of refineries in their portfolio offered over-capacity and consequently Stanlow, their last British refinery, was put up for sale.

After a prolonged period of negotiation, Stanlow was sold by Shell to Essar Energy for approximately $1.3 billion (£814 million) in 2011. Essar has stated their desire to expand the site with a 25% increase in output. Following the bankruptcy of Petroplus which ran the Coryton Refinery in January 2012, Essar stated their belief that Stanlow, being a large refinery, would be able to compete with refineries in Asia and the Middle East. Essar plan a £250 million expansion of Stanlow, with production of diesel and aviation fuel to be increased. In April 2021 the company was reported to be heavily in debt after fossil fuel demand dropped during the COVID-19 pandemic. In September 2021 it was reported that the facility is at the "brink of collapse".

Protests
Stanlow's position as one of the largest and well-known refineries in the country, has led to numerous protests over a number of decades. In the UK fuel crisis of 2000, protests over government taxation on fuel began at Stanlow. A large fuel price protest was staged in May 2011 with the objective of "shutting down" the refinery.

During the 2022 Russian invasion of Ukraine, dockworkers of the Unite union began to refuse to unload Russian oil from any ship. Despite sanctions on Russian shipping, Russian oil continued to arrive at port on ships owned and flagged in other countries. Dockworkers have called this a loophole in sanctions.

Statistics

Storage capacity: 2 million tonnes of crude oil and products 
Refining capacity: 12 million tonnes per year. The manufacturing complex employs 800 people.
Barrel per day output: 
Product output
petrol 3 million tonnes
diesel 3.5 million tonnes
kerosene/jet fuel 2 million tonnes
LPG & petrochemical feedstocks 1.5 million tonnes
Fuel oil 1 million tonnes

Cultural references
In 1980, electronic band Orchestral Manoeuvres in the Dark (OMD) from nearby Wirral featured a song about the refinery called "Stanlow" on their second album, Organisation. Welsh band Jesu's 2007 album Conqueror features a track titled "Stanlow" that concerns itself with the refinery.

See also 

 Petroleum refining in the United Kingdom
 Tranmere Oil Terminal
 UK oil pipeline network
 Oil terminals in the United Kingdom

References

Further reading

External links
Stanlow United Website of the Stanlow unionised workforce.

Oil refineries in the United Kingdom
Buildings and structures in Cheshire
Ellesmere Port